Lewis Howarth Ryder (15 November 1941 – 18 December 2018) was a British theoretical physicist.

Biography
Ryder earned a master's degree in physics from Oxford University, a PhD in Mathematical Physics from Edinburgh University under supervision of Peter Higgs, and later an SERC fellowship.

In 1967 he went to the University of Kent where he remained for the rest of his career and became a senior lecturer.

His research interests were in geometrical aspects of particle physics and its parallels with general relativity, and the possible existence and detection of torsion and curvature in spacetime. He also did research on the geometric phase and in condensed matter physics.

Books

References

External links
University of Kent
Lewis Ryder (Research gate)
Google scholar

1941 births
2018 deaths
Academics of the University of Kent
British physicists
Alumni of the University of Edinburgh
Alumni of the University of Oxford